Connor Alexander Kirby (born 10 September 1998) is an English professional footballer who plays as a midfielder for Buxton. He has previously had spells at  Macclesfield Town, Altrincham and started his career at Sheffield Wednesday.

Career

Sheffield Wednesday
Kirby signed his first professional contract for Sheffield Wednesday in October 2015.

In April 2018 he made his first team debut for the club, playing as a substitute as Wednesday beat Reading in the Football League Championship.

Macclesfield Town (loan)
Kirby signed on a season-long loan at Macclesfield Town on 9 August 2019.

Harrogate Town
Kirby was the first signing for Harrogate Town in their first season in the Football League. On 21 April 2021, he joined National League side Altrincham on loan for the remainder of the season. After a successful loan spell the previous season, Kirby returned to Altrincham on loan in July, signing until 3 January 2022. On 11 September 2021, Kirby suffered a double compound fracture of his left leg, in a game against Wealdstone.

Buxton
On 15 July 2022, Kirby joined Buxton for their first season in the National League North following promotion.

Career statistics

Notes

References

1998 births
Living people
Footballers from Barnsley
English footballers
Association football midfielders
Sheffield Wednesday F.C. players
Macclesfield Town F.C. players
Harrogate Town A.F.C. players
Altrincham F.C. players
Buxton F.C. players
English Football League players
National League (English football) players